Jonathan Newdick, artist and illustrator, was born in Newbury in 1948, and was brought up in the rural South of England. His work references trees, buildings and the land; drawings about rather than of things.

Career
In 1971 after graduating from The West Sussex College of Art became a designer in Fleet Street, but left London and returned to Sussex, where he worked as a typographer and then book designer. He also worked as a visiting lecturer at the London College of Printing, alongside working as an illustrator for books and magazines, and continuing to draw landscapes. His diverse work-load led to a Spanish network television documentary production in the early 1980s.

In 1990 he was awarded a Master's Degree in the Cultural and Critical Theory of British Art from the University of Sussex after which he turned from designing to drawing and printmaking.

He was the Artist in Residence at Petworth House for the National Trust in the late 1990s, where he spent a year on the estate, often working on large-scale pieces in the fields.

In 2011, he began work on a set of pencil drawings which can be seen as a continuation of the Recording Britain scheme of the Second World War, documenting barns and farm buildings of the Leconfield Estate in West Sussex which appeared to be under threat from development.

His work has been exhibited as part of public collections in properties owned by the National Trust.

Kevis House Gallery in Petworth has a selection of Newdick's work for sale.

Collaborations
He set up The Window Press as illustrator in conjunction with author Peter Jerrome to publish a manuscript by photographer George Garland in 1976, recalling Petworth before photography.

Publications
The Complete Freshwater Fishes Of The British Isles. Newdick, J. (1979) Published by A & C Black, London
 Not Submitted Elsewhere: Photographs from the 1920s by George Garland by Peter Jerrome and Jonathan Newdick, published 1980 (94 pp., Petworth: The Window Press)
 Proud Petworth and Beyond: Photographs from the '20s & '30s By George Garland by Peter Jerrome and Jonathan Newdick, published 1981 (150 pp., Petworth: The Window Press)
 Petworth: Time Out of Mind by Peter Jerrome and Jonathan Newdick, published 1982 (159 pp., 200 illus., Petworth: The Window Press)
 Petworth: The Winds of Change by Peter Jerrome and Jonathan Newdick, published 1983 (160 pp., Petworth: The Window Press)
 Men with Laughter in their Hearts: Photographs from the 1930S by George Garland by Peter Jerrome and Jonathan Newdick, published 1986 (Petworth: The Window Press)
 Old and New, Teasing and True: Photographs by George Garland 1922-39 by Peter Jerrome and Jonathan Newdick, published 1988 (Petworth: The Window Press)
 Out of Time? (2012) Publisher: Jonathan Newdick

References

Further reading
Beckingham, Peter, South Downs Showcase - 200 Years of Creativity around Lodsworth, Petworth and Midhurst, Lodsworth Heritage Society, 2021 
 Purkiss, A.K. Portraits of British Artists - Artists' Photo Diary 2021, ISSUU, 2021 https://issuu.com/anne.purkiss/docs/artists_photo_diaries_2021 p.68

External links
 Jonathan Newdick in conversation at West Horsley Place, 2019
 Jonathan Newdick film on Solvent Transfer role in image making, 2014

1948 births
Alumni of the University of Sussex
Living people
English illustrators
Book designers
English artists
South Downs artists